Verticordia endlicheriana var. compacta is a flowering plant in the myrtle family, Myrtaceae and is endemic to the south-west of Western Australia. It is a small, usually compact shrub with sweetly-perfumed, golden-yellow flowers which fade through reddish to almost black as they age.

Description

Flowering occurs from August to November.

Taxonomy and naming
Verticordia endlicheriana was first formally described by Johannes Conrad Schauer in 1844 and the description was published in Lehmann's Plantae Preissianae. In 1991, Alex George undertook a review of the genus Verticordia and described five varieties of Verticordia endlicheriana including this variety. The varietal name "compacta" refers to the compact, cauliflower-like form of the plant.

Distribution and habitat
This variety grows in sand, sometimes over gravel, often with other verticordias in heath, shrubland or woodland. It occurs between the Latham, Mount Gibson, Moora and Dowerin areas in the Avon Wheatbelt, Geraldton Sandplains, Mallee and Swan Coastal Plain biogeographic regions.

Conservation
Verticordia endlicheriana var. compacta is classified as "not threatened" by the Western Australian Government Department of Parks and Wildlife.

Use in horticulture
Although this variety has excellent horticultural potential because of its compact habit and masses of brightly coloured, sweetly-scented flowers, it has proven difficult to establish in gardens. It is easy to propagate from cuttings but developing a mature plant from the struck cuttings has presented difficulties. Greater success has been obtained using gravelly or loamy soils rather than sand.

References

endlicheriana
Rosids of Western Australia
Eudicots of Western Australia
Plants described in 1991